Masayoshi Fukuda (福田 将儀, born April 17, 1992 in Sanmu, Chiba Prefecture) is a Japanese former professional baseball outfielder in Japan's Nippon Professional Baseball. He played for the Tohoku Rakuten Golden Eagles from 2015 to 2017.

External links

NPB stats

1992 births
Living people
People from Sanmu
Baseball people from Chiba Prefecture
Japanese baseball players
Nippon Professional Baseball outfielders
Tohoku Rakuten Golden Eagles players